Igor Solopov (17 April 1961 – 12 June 2019) was a Russian-born Estonian table tennis player. Born in Magnitogorsk, Russian SFSR, he represented Estonia in the men's singles event at the 1992 Summer Olympics. Solopov, who participated at seven World Table Tennis Championships, previously won a bronze medal with the Soviet men's team at the 1978 European Table Tennis Championships.

From the mid-1990s, Solopov resided in Sweden. His death on 12 June 2019, at the age of 58, was announced by the Table Tennis Federation of Russia.

References

External links

1961 births
2019 deaths
Russian male table tennis players
Estonian male table tennis players
Russian emigrants to Estonia
Russian emigrants to Sweden
Table tennis players at the 1992 Summer Olympics
Tallinn University alumni
Estonian people of Russian descent
Olympic table tennis players of Estonia
People from Magnitogorsk
Sportspeople from Chelyabinsk Oblast